Three ships of the Royal Norwegian Navy have borne the name HNoMS Vidar, after Víðarr – Norse god of vengeance and son of Odin and the giantess Gríðr:

  was a paddlesteam schooner
  was a  Rendel gunboat built for the Royal Norwegian Navy at Karljohansvern Naval Yard in 1878
  was a minelayer built in 1977, and sold to the Lithuanian Navy in 2006

Royal Norwegian Navy ship names